Adam Smith Blacklaw (2 September 1937 – 28 February 2010) was a Scottish professional football player who played as a goalkeeper.

Blacklaw joined the Burnley ground staff as a schoolboy apprentice in 1954, directly from Frederick Street School in Aberdeen, earning a professional contract in October of that year. He made his first-team debut on 22 December 1956 and spent over ten seasons with the Clarets. He took over as regular goalkeeper when Colin McDonald suffered a broken leg in March 1959. During his time at Burnley, Blacklaw earned a League championship medal in season 1959–60 and an FA Cup runners-up medal in 1962. He played regularly for Burnley until 1965.
 
Blacklaw joined Blackburn Rovers for £15,000 at the start of the 1967–68 season and stayed for three years before finishing his career with short spells at Blackpool in season 1970–71 and moving into the non-league game with Great Harwood in season 1971–72. He later had a spell as manager of Clitheroe.

Blacklaw represented Scotland at schoolboy, under–23 and full international levels. He played in two international friendlies in June 1963, a 4–3 defeat by Norway and a 6–2 win against Spain in Madrid. His last appearance for Scotland was on 7 December 1965 in Naples, where they lost 3–0 to Italy in a crucial 1966 FIFA World Cup qualification match.

Blacklaw died on 28 February 2010. For their fixture away to Arsenal on 6 March 2010, the Burnley players wore black armbands in memory of him.

Honours
Burnley
Football League champions: 1959–60
Football League runner-up: 1961–62
FA Cup finalists: 1962

References

External links
Article by Tony Scholes, Burnley Hall of Fame

1937 births
2010 deaths
Footballers from Aberdeen
Scottish footballers
Association football goalkeepers
Scotland international footballers
Burnley F.C. players
Blackpool F.C. players
Blackburn Rovers F.C. players
Great Harwood F.C. players
English Football League players
Scotland under-23 international footballers
FA Cup Final players